Revelations Entertainment is an independent movie production company founded by actor Morgan Freeman and business partner Lori McCreary in 1996. Its mission statement, to "reveal truth," drives to company produce thought-provoking entertainment with artistic integrity and "soul."

In 2006, Revelations became the first film production company in history to distribute a film (10 Items or Less) online while the movie was still playing in theaters. This was achieved by using ClickStar (also founded by Freeman and McCreary as a joint venture with Intel Corporation) as their online distribution site.

Productions
Revelations Entertainment is behind several well-known movie and TV productions, including:

These productions have involved established actors such as Monica Bellucci, Kirsten Dunst, Danny Glover, Gene Hackman, Holly Hunter, Thomas Jane, Paz Vega, Zina Pistor and Billy Bob Thornton.

Investments
In 2009 Revelations Entertainment signed on to financially back Digiboo, a digital Kiosk company. Digiboo's touch-screen kiosks can hold more than 1,000 movie and TV shows, which can be downloaded to USB 3.0 flash devices within a minute. Revelations Digital CEO Samuel Edge will serve as the chief technology officer at Digiboo.

The ClickStar online movie service, a joint venture between production company Revelations Entertainment and chip-maker Intel Corporation, stopped operations in 2008.

See also
Official website
http://www.imdb.com/company/co0075256/?ref_=fn_al_co_1
Clickstar Shuts Down
Digiboo website

References

Film production companies of the United States